Thelma Cornelia Davidson Adair (born Thelma Cornelia Davidson; August 29, 1920) is an American educator, Presbyterian church leader, advocate for human rights, peace and justice issues, writer and activist. She has been active with Church Women United, a Christian women's advocacy movement. She is an ordained Elder for the Mount Morris Ascension Presbyterian Church of New York City in Harlem. Adair was the moderator for the 1976 Assembly  United Presbyterian Church in the United States of America (UPCUSA). She married, in 1940, the Reverend Arthur Eugene Adair,  founder and minister of the church from 1943 until his death in 1979.

Adair is an advocate for early childhood education and helped to establish Head Start programs in Harlem. She has lived in Harlem since 1942 and is Professor Emeritus of Queens College, a CUNY college.

Early life and education
Adair was born Thelma Cornelia Davidson in 1920 in Iron Station, North Carolina, one of six children. She lived there while in elementary school. Her family subsequently moved to Kings Mountain, North Carolina. She married Reverend Dr. Arthur Eugene Adair and they moved to New York City in 1942. He became a Senior Pastor of Mount Morris United Presbyterian Church (UPC).

Adair is an affiliated graduate from Barber–Scotia College (Concord, North Carolina) and Bennett College (Greensboro, North Carolina). She earned a master's degree and Doctorate of Education from Teachers College, Columbia University.

World War II
Like many African Americans and Americans, Adair participated in the World War II efforts at home and abroad. She worked in a war plant. She inspected radar tubes. She was also a young mother at the time. She described her experience:

Career
Adair was an organizer for West Harlem Head Start Programs. In 1944 she was an organizer for Mt. Morris UPC's Project Uplift, a precursor to the Arthur Eugene and Thelma Adair Community Life Center Head Start.   The center services more than 250 children throughout various locations in Harlem.  Adair has published and written numerous articles on early childhood education. Her publications are authoritative guides for early childhood educators throughout the United States.

In 1976, Adair was elected as a Moderator of the General Assembly for the Presbyterian Church, the first black woman to attain this role, travelling to 115 countries during her term. She is one of the original founders of Presbyterian Senior Services, and is a participant with the Fellowship of the "Least Coin", a worldwide prayer movement. She was president of Church Women United from 1980 to 1984.

She was honored in 2011 by Congressman Charles Rangel.  She attended the Selma, Alabama, 50th anniversary of the Selma to Montgomery marches across the Edmund Pettus Bridge.

Affiliations
 Chair, Presbyterian Senior Services
 Advisor, Church Women United, National Board
 Board of Visitors, Davidson College
 Advisory Council, National Council of Churches
 Member, Harlem Hospital Community Advisory Board

Awards
 The Thelma C. Adair Award on Presbyterian Senior Services
 Barber-Scotia Alumni Award for Meritorious Service in the Field of Education
 Columbia University, Teacher's College Distinguished Alumni Award
 United Negro College Fund Distinguished Award for Outstanding Service and Commitment of Higher Education
 1986 Recipient of Women of Faith Award from the Presbyterian Church
 1991 Recipient of National Association of Presbyterian Clergywomen Women of Faith Awards
 2008 Recipient of the Medal of Distinction Barnard College
 2011 recipient of the Maggie Kuhn Presbyterian Church Award

References

External links
 Elders' House (The Elders' Gift to the Children)

1920 births
Living people
People from Harlem
People from Lincoln County, North Carolina
Activists for African-American civil rights
Women civil rights activists
American women's rights activists
American Presbyterians
Teachers College, Columbia University alumni
Education activists
Elder rights activists
American anti-racism activists
African-American centenarians
American centenarians
Women centenarians
21st-century African-American people
20th-century African-American people